Igor Galo (born 5 December 1948) is a Serbian and Croatian actor, perhaps best known for his work in Sam Peckinpah's Cross of Iron. He was born on 5 December 1948 in Ćuprija, SR Serbia, FPR Yugoslavia. After moving around Yugoslavia his family settled in Pula where Galo completed gymnasium high school in 1967. He enrolled into the University of Zagreb forestry and economics studies but quickly dropped out when he started his acting career in 1968. Over the years he appeared in over 60 cinematic and TV roles out of which at least 22 were lead role. Beyond the former Yugoslavia he appeared as Lieutenant Meyer in 1977 Cross of Iron.

In 2017, Igor Galo has signed the Declaration on the Common Language of the Croats, Serbs, Bosniaks and Montenegrins.

Partial filmography
 I Have Two Mothers and Two Fathers (1968)
 The Bridge (1969)
 Cross of Iron (1977)
 Operation Stadium (1977)

References

External links 

 

1948 births
Serbian male film actors
Yugoslav male film actors
Living people
Place of birth missing (living people)
20th-century Serbian male actors
People from Ćuprija
Signatories of the Declaration on the Common Language
Croats of Serbia